Rosedale is a suburb of New Zealand's southernmost city, Invercargill.

Demographics

Rosedale had a population of 1,872 at the 2018 New Zealand census, an increase of 39 people (2.1%) since the 2013 census, and an increase of 6 people (0.3%) since the 2006 census. There were 753 households. There were 864 males and 1,005 females, giving a sex ratio of 0.86 males per female. The median age was 45.6 years (compared with 37.4 years nationally), with 363 people (19.4%) aged under 15 years, 249 (13.3%) aged 15 to 29, 906 (48.4%) aged 30 to 64, and 354 (18.9%) aged 65 or older.

Ethnicities were 90.5% European/Pākehā, 9.0% Māori, 1.8% Pacific peoples, 6.6% Asian, and 1.3% other ethnicities (totals add to more than 100% since people could identify with multiple ethnicities).

The proportion of people born overseas was 12.2%, compared with 27.1% nationally.

Although some people objected to giving their religion, 44.1% had no religion, 49.0% were Christian, 0.8% were Hindu, 0.5% were Muslim, 0.3% were Buddhist and 1.0% had other religions.

Of those at least 15 years old, 408 (27.0%) people had a bachelor or higher degree, and 252 (16.7%) people had no formal qualifications. The median income was $42,600, compared with $31,800 nationally. 432 people (28.6%) earned over $70,000 compared to 17.2% nationally. The employment status of those at least 15 was that 834 (55.3%) people were employed full-time, 213 (14.1%) were part-time, and 30 (2.0%) were unemployed.

Education
James Hargest Junior Campus is in Rosedale providing education for years 7 and 8. It was Rosedale Intermediate School until a 2004 consolidation of schools, when it was combined with Collingwood Intermediate School as part of James Hargest College.

References

Suburbs of Invercargill